Phaenomenella callophorella is a species of sea snail, a marine gastropod mollusk in the family Buccinidae, the true whelks.

Description
The length of the shell attains 19.2 mm.

Distribution
This species occurs in the South China Sea off Taiwan.

References

 Fraussen K. 2004. Two new deep water Buccinidae (Gastropoda) from western Pacific. Novapex 5(2-3) : 85-89 
 Fraussen K. & Stahlschmidt P. (2012) Two new Phaenomenella (Gastropoda: Buccinidae) from Vietnam. Gloria Maris 51(4): 85-92.
 Fraussen K. & Stahlschmidt P. (2013) The extensive Indo-Pacific radiation of Phaenomenella Fraussen & Hadorn, 2006 (Gastropoda: Buccinidae) with description of a new species. Novapex 14(4): 81-86.

External links

Buccinidae
Gastropods described in 2003